Charles Alan Short (born 1955) is a British architect and academic. He has been Professor of Architecture at the University of Cambridge since 2001, and President of Clare Hall, Cambridge since 2020. He champions low-energy buildings that will be resilient to climate change.

Selected buildings designed by Short

 Queens Building De Montfort University, Leicester (1993)
 Contact Theatre, Manchester (1999)
 Lanchester Library, Coventry (2000)
 Lichfield Garrick Theatre, Lichfield (2003)
 UCL School of Slavonic and East European Studies, London (2004)

Publications by Short

References

1955 births
Presidents of Clare Hall, Cambridge
20th-century British architects
21st-century British architects
Living people